= Sankha Park =

Park in Nepal

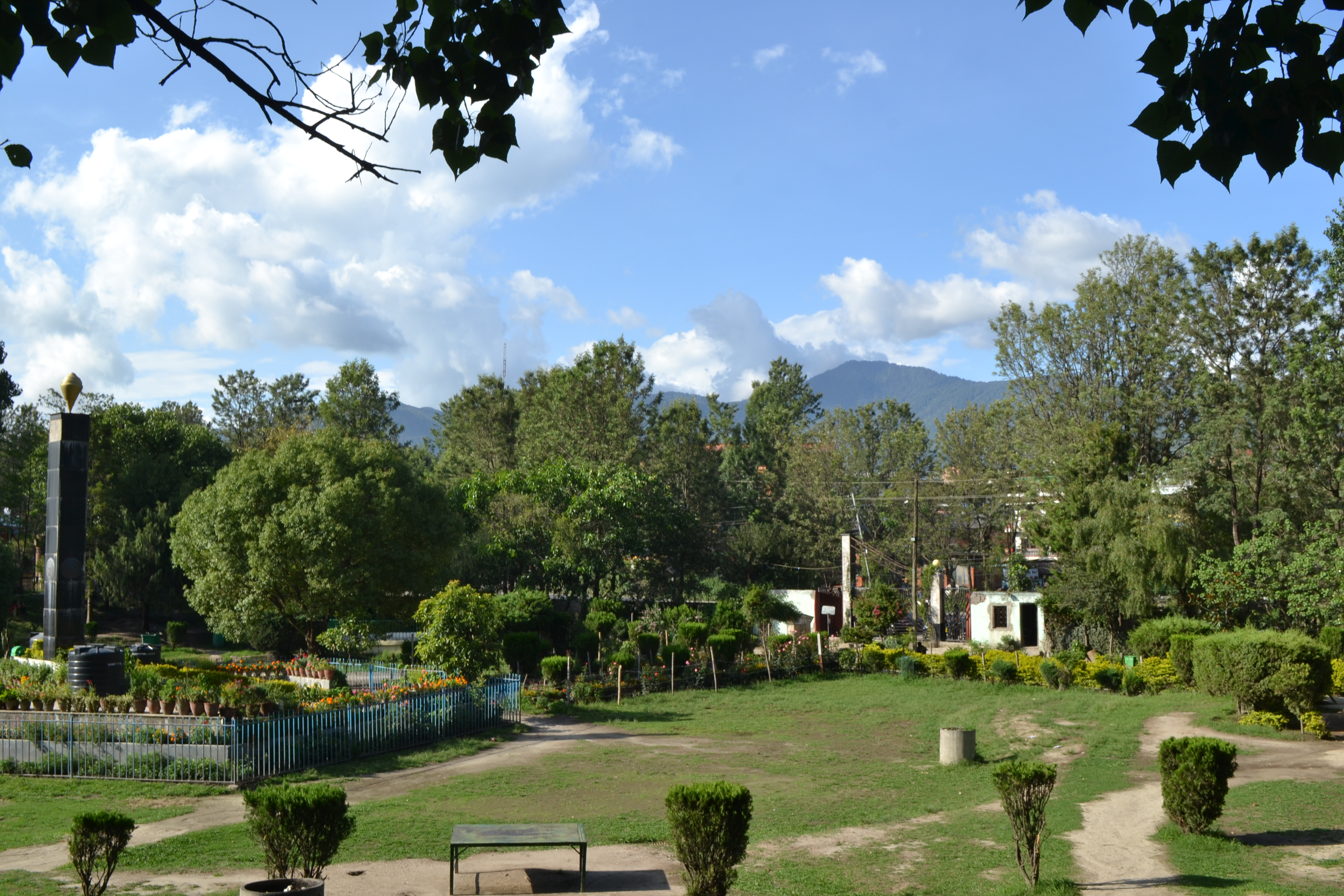
- Interactive map of Sankha Park
- Location: Kathmandu
- Coordinates: 27°43′59.78″N 85°20′33.25″E
- Operator: Kathmandu Metropolitan City
- Open: 6:00-18:00

Sankha Park is a park near Chappal Karkhana, Kathmandu. The residents visit the park for picnicking, meeting and morning walk. The park is managed by Kathmandu Metropolitan City. This park is situated beside a busy ring road and offers solace to the many passers-by from the pollution and heat of the city.

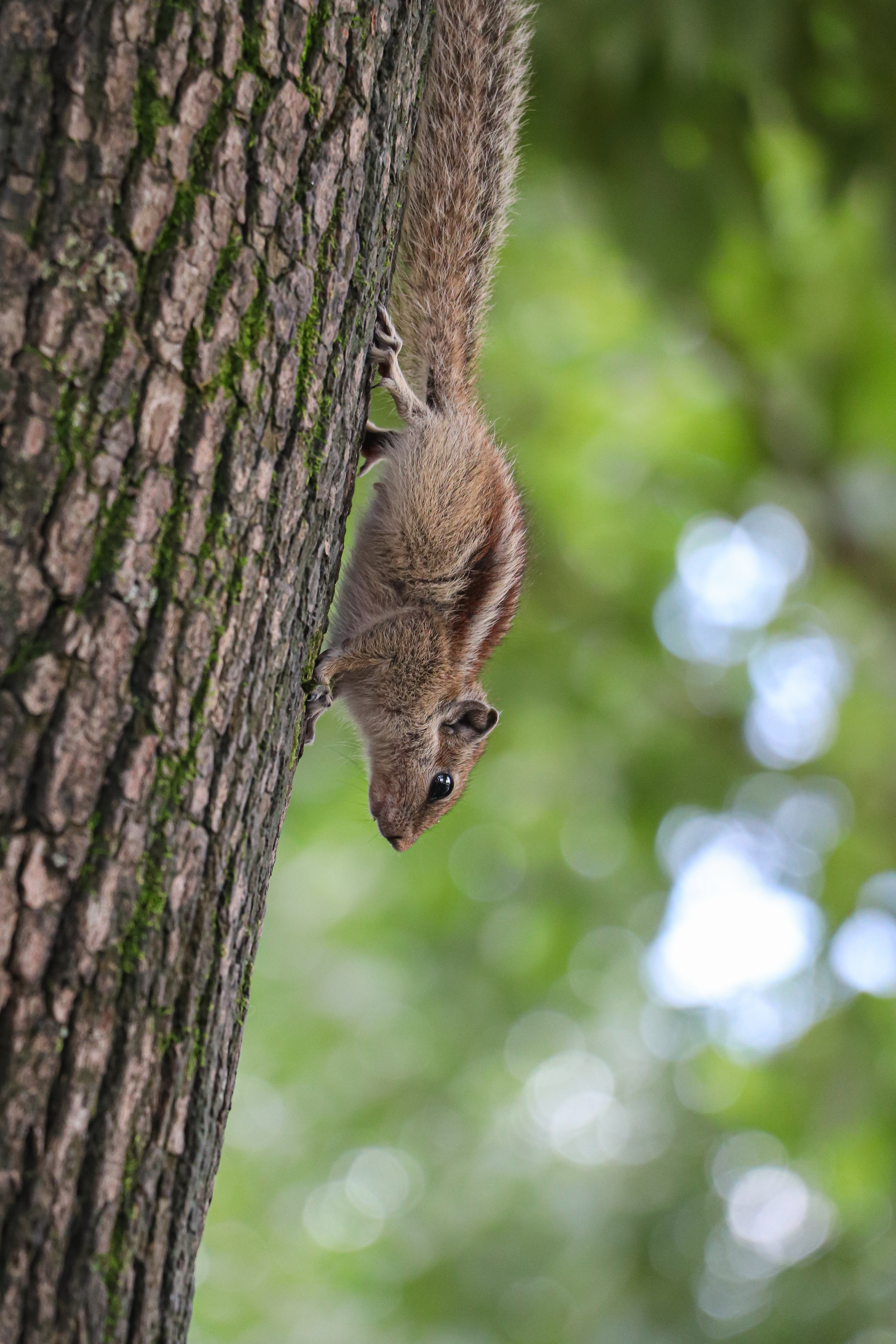
A northern or five striped palm squirrel on a tree
